Aitor Martínez Rodríguez (born 22 August 1993) is a Spanish freestyle swimmer. He competed in the men's 4 × 100 metre freestyle relay event at the 2016 Summer Olympics.

References

External links
 

1993 births
Living people
Olympic swimmers of Spain
Swimmers at the 2016 Summer Olympics
Place of birth missing (living people)
Swimmers at the 2010 Summer Youth Olympics
Swimmers at the 2013 Mediterranean Games
Spanish male freestyle swimmers
Mediterranean Games competitors for Spain